Mark Keenan (born 11 November 1975) is a former professional rugby league footballer who played in the 1990s and 2000s.

International honours
Mark Keenan won a cap for Scotland while at Workington Town in 1996.

References

1975 births
Living people
Place of birth missing (living people)
Rugby league halfbacks
Rugby league wingers
Scotland national rugby league team players
Whitehaven R.L.F.C. players
Workington Town players